The City of Wheat Ridge is a home rule municipality located in Jefferson County, Colorado, United States. Wheat Ridge is located immediately west of Denver and is a part of the Denver–Aurora–Lakewood, CO Metropolitan Statistical Area. The city had a population of 30,166 as of the 2010 Census.

History 
Although Wheat Ridge is a relatively young incorporated city, it has a history based on agriculture and the community's location along regional travel routes. It grew from a popular rest stop for travelers during the Gold Rush of the late 1850s to an agricultural and suburban community known as the “Carnation City” in the mid 1900s. As the residential areas of unincorporated Jefferson County grew to provide housing to the Denver workforce during the 1950s, the major transportation corridors extending from Denver developed with commercial services. During that era, the formation of numerous utility and fire protection districts provided these unincorporated areas with urban services. Eventually, due to the increasing annexation pressure from nearby municipalities, Wheat Ridge incorporated in 1969.

Geography

Wheat Ridge is located in the Colorado Piedmont on the western edge of the Great Plains just east of the Front Range of the Southern Rocky Mountains. Clear Creek, a tributary of the South Platte River, flows east then northeast through the city. Lena Gulch, a tributary of Clear Creek, flows northeast through the southwest part of the city.

There are several small lakes and reservoirs in Wheat Ridge. Crown Hill Lake, Kestrel Pond, and North Henry Lee Reservoir are located in the south-central part of the city. West Lake, Tabor Lake, and Prospect Lake are located along Clear Creek in the west-central part of the city.

As a suburb of Denver, Wheat Ridge is part of both the greater Denver metropolitan area and the Front Range Urban Corridor. It borders other communities on all sides including:  Arvada to the north; Lakeside, Mountain View, and Denver to the east; Edgewater to the southeast; Lakewood to the south; Applewood to the southwest; and Fairmount to the northwest.

Climate
The climate is described as Humid Continental by the Köppen Climate System, abbreviated as Dfb.

Demographics

As of the 2010 census, there were 30,166 people, 13,976 households, and 7,489 families residing in the city. The racial makeup of the city was 85.6% White, 1.6% Asian, 1.2% African American, 1.2% American Indian, 0.1% Pacific Islander, 6.9% from other races, and 3.4% from two or more races. Hispanics and Latinos of any race were 20.9% of the population.

There were 13,976 households, out of which 23.1% had children under the age of 18 living with them, 36.5% were married couples living together, 5.4% had a male householder with no wife present, 11.6% had a female householder with no husband present, and 46.4% were non-families. 38.4% of all households were made up of individuals, and 14.7% had someone living alone who was 65 years of age or older. The average household size was 2.12, and the average family size was 2.81.

The distribution of the population by age was 18.7% under the age of 18, 7.3% from 18 to 24, 25.7% from 25 to 44, 29.7% from 45 to 64, and 18.6% who were 65 years of age or older. The median age was 43.7 years. The gender makeup of the city was 48.6% male and 51.4% female.

The median income for a household in the city was $47,014, and the median income for a family was $59,275. Males had a median income of $45,655 versus $36,741 for females. The city's per capita income was $28,372. About 8.7% of families and 10.9% of the population were below the poverty line, including 16.7% of those under age 18 and 6.3% of those age 65 or over.

Economy
As of 2013, 65.2% of the population over the age of 16 was in the labor force. 0.2% was in the armed forces, and 65.0% was in the civilian labor force with 58.7% employed and 6.3% unemployed. The occupational composition of the employed civilian labor force was: 37.3% in management, business, science, and arts; 26.2% in sales and office occupations; 18.5% in service occupations; 10.6% in production, transportation, and material moving; 7.4% in natural resources, construction, and maintenance. The three industries employing the largest percentages of the working civilian labor force were:  educational services, health care, and social assistance (21.4%); professional, scientific, and management, and administrative and waste management services (12.3%); retail trade (12.1%).

The cost of living in Wheat Ridge is above average; compared to a U.S. average of 100, the cost of living index for the community is 108.5. As of 2013, the median home value in the city was $237,500, the median selected monthly owner cost was $1,556 for housing units with a mortgage and $406 for those without, and the median gross rent was $820.

Agriculture
Until the 1960s, the city's identity was primarily defined by mid to large-scale agricultural production. Orchards and crop fields were the predominant use with pockets of homes and businesses located amongst the agrarian landscape. Glimpses into the city's agricultural past can still be found, however Wheat Ridge has experienced substantial population growth and development over the last 40 years and is largely built out with a combination of residential, commercial, and office uses.

Recent zoning changes have allowed for urban agriculture to see a resurgence in all parts of the city. City regulations allow homeowners to engage in a range of urban agricultural activities, including growing and selling produce and keeping animals such as bees and chickens. City Council adopted Ordinance 1491 in May 2011 which supports urban agriculture in Wheat Ridge. This ordinance updated the city's regulations so that community gardens (under the category of “urban gardens”), farmers’ markets, and produce stands are now allowed in any zone district.

A summary of the three uses permitted in each zone district may be found below.  
 Urban Gardens – an urban garden is defined as an area of land formally managed, organized, and maintained by an individual or group of individuals to grow and harvest food crops or non-food ornamental crops, such as flowers. Common examples of urban gardens include: • Community gardens, where plots of land are leased for a minimal cost and crops are usually consumed or donated • Market gardens, where crops are sold for profit • Community supported agriculture (CSA), where crops are sold or donated for shareholder consumption Urban gardens are allowed in all zone districts, including residential.  
 Farmers’ Markets – farmers' markets are allowed in any zone district, except in residential zone districts on properties where the primary use is a single- or two-family home. Farmers’ markets require a business license, which you may apply for through the city's Sales Tax Division.
 Produce Stands - a produce stand is a temporary structure where agricultural products such as raw vegetables, fruits, herbs, flowers, plants, nuts, honey, and eggs are sold. Value-added agricultural products which are made from raw agricultural products such as jams and jellies may also be sold from produce stands. Produce stands require a business license, which you may apply for through the city's Sales Tax Division. Produce stands on residential properties must also follow the rules for home occupations.

Local Farms in Wheat Ridge
 Clear Creek Organics
 Sweet Ridge Farm
 True Roots
 Circle Fresh Farms
 Five Fridges Farm
 Roost Farms

Community Development
Wheat Ridge has seen a resurgence in community development efforts focused on improving the social connections between community members as well as improving the built environment in the city to better facilitate these connections.

Wheat Ridge Envision Wheat Ridge Comprehensive Plan 
Following direction from the City Council, the City embarked on a Comprehensive Plan Update that began in the fall of 2008.  The City hired a consultant, Clarion Associates, with the expertise in comprehensive plan development to assist the City in updating the plan.  In addition, the City formed a Citizens Advisory Committee to provide advice and feedback to the Planning Commission and City Council on the development of the Plan.  On October 12, 2009, City Council approved a resolution, Resolution 52–2009, adopting the Envision Wheat Ridge Comprehensive Plan.

Culture

Points of interest
Wheat Ridge is home to the James H. Baugh house, which is listed in the National Register of Historic Places and the Colorado State Register of Historic Properties. The Baugh House is an 1860 hand-hewn log cabin encased in a circa 1904 frame farmhouse, and is one of several historic structures in the Wheat Ridge Historic Park. The Wheat Ridge Historical Society, in cooperation with the Colorado Historical Society and the City of Wheat Ridge, restored the house, which was designated on August 14, 2012.

Notable people

Notable individuals who were born in or have lived in Wheat Ridge include Atlanta Braves pitcher Mark Melancone, famous Texan Bob Breedlove, actor and singer Dean Reed, Jolly Rancher founders Bill and Dorothy Harmsen, and U.S. Olympic cyclist Linda Brenneman.

See also

 List of municipalities in Colorado

References

External links

 
 CDOT map of Wheat Ridge
 Wheat Ridge Historical Society

 
Cities in Colorado
Cities in Jefferson County, Colorado
Populated places established in 1969